Overdo is a surname. Notable people with the surname include:

Adam Overdo of Bartholomew Fayre: A Comedy
Robert Overdo (fl. 1368–1386), MP for Appleby-in-Westmorland
Robert Overdo (fl. 1402), MP for Appleby-in-Westmorland
, MP  for Appleby-in-Westmorland